Gideon "Gidi" Gov (4 August 1950) is an Israeli singer, TV host, entertainer, and actor. He was married to the late Anat Gov with whom he had three children.

Biography

Early life
Gov was born in Rehovot, Israel, to Daniel and Tzipora Gov. As a child Gov suffered from asthma. Gov's father died when he was very young, which made his mother move with him from place to place, including Tel Aviv and Eilat. Growing up, Gov never dreamed of becoming a singer. When he enlisted to the IDF in 1969 Yair Rosenblum recommended that Gov be auditioned for the Nahal entertainment troupe. Gov passed the auditions and joined the Nahal entertainment troupe. There Gov actually began his acting and singing career.

1970s

Gov's first major breakthrough occurred when Gov sang in the 1973 Israeli "Song and chorus Festival" (פסטיבל הזמר והפזמון) the song "Rise up and arrive" (יעלה ויבוא). The song reached only number eight, but become one of the songs most identified with the competition.

During the same year Gov established along with some of the former Nahal troupe members (Efraim Shamir, Danny Sanderson and Alon Olearchik) and two others (Yoni Rechter and Yitzhak Klepter) the band Kaveret. The band became one of the most popular Israeli bands in the 1970s and is still considered today as one of the most successful Israeli bands in the history of popular music and entertainment in Israel. The band released three albums, represented Israel in the 1974 Eurovision Song Contest with the song "Natati La Khayay" and won the title "Band of the Year" four times in succession in the Israeli annual Hebrew song chart of Kol Yisrael. The band was eventually disbanded in 1976.

After the breakup of Kaveret Gov joined the short-lived band "Parnasa Tova", which included Yehudit Ravitz and Shmulik Bilu. The band recorded several cover versions of old songs and produced an album. In 1978, Gov put out his first solo album ("Taklit Rishon", or "first album"). In addition to his musical career, during the 1970s Gov also participated in the 1974 Israeli TV series "The Magic Door" (דלת הקסמים), and in the 1977 Israeli film "Masa Alonkot" (מסע אלונקות), and in Ram Loevy's 1978 film "Khirbet Khize", the 1978 film "Ha-Lehaka" ("The Troupe") which described the life in an Israeli military band, and the 1979 film "Dizengoff 99", and the 1979 film "Do not ask if I love" (אל תשאלי אם אני אוהב).

In 1979, Gov became a co-host in the successful Israeli entertainment show "Zehu Ze!" ("That's it!"). Gov appeared intermittently in this show until it ended in 1993.

In 1979, Gov formed the successful Israeli pop-rock band "Gazoz" together with Danny Sanderson, which recorded and released the albums "Gazoz" (גזוז) and "second incarnation" (גלגול שני).

1980s 

In 1980 Gov and Sanderson formed their third band Doda, which succeeded less than Kaveret and Gazoz.

During the early 1980s Gov participated in several Israeli children's music festivals.

In 1983 Gov released his second album, "40:06", named after the album's total length.

Later on Gov appeared in the 1983 Israeli film "The silver platter" (מגש הכסף).

In 1985 Gov released his third solo album, "Tnu Ligdol Besheket" ("Let Me Grow Up in Peace"), which included mostly children's songs.

From 1986 to 1992 Gov participated in almost all the Israeli children's music, and even hosted it 1986.

In 1987 Gov decided to release the rock oriented album "Derech Eretz" (דרך ארץ), produced by Louie Lahav. The majority of songs on the album were composed by Yehuda Poliker. The album was a big success and sold more than 50,000 copies – the best selling album of the Gov until then.

In 1989 Gov participated in the play "The Gigolo from Congo" by Hanoch Levin, and performed the title song "What do you know about love" (מה אתה בכלל יודע על אהבה) for the film "Ehad Mishelano".

1990s

In 1991 Gov released one of his most successful solo albums – Ein Od Yom ("No Other Day"). The album sold more than 70,000 copies. In 1993 Gov released the compilation album "שירים שהתפזרו", which containing different original songs performed by Gov between 1973 and 1992 which did not appear in his previous solo albums. In 1994 he left "Zehu Ze!" to his own host musical/talk show, "Laila Gov" (a play on the phrase "laila tov", meaning "good night"), on Channel 2, Israel's first commercial TV channel. The show which aired from 1994 to 1998 became very successful. During the show Gov used to regularly perform different songs along with different popular Israeli singers whom were guests on the show. Subsequently, in 1995 Gov released the double disc compilation album "שירים מלילה גוב", and in 1997 released the triple disc compilation album "שירים מלילה גוב 2" which both contained the songs Gov performed during the show with his guests.

2000s
In 2000 Gov began hosting a dining TV show on the Israeli Channel 8 called "Gidi Gov goes to eat" (גידי גוב הולך לאכול) and appeared in a one time special Kaveret reunion concert designed to raise money for an urgent surgery of the band member Isaac Klepter. This year also instructed the Tammuz Awards Israeli music, held for the first time was broadcast on Channel 2. Gov off the ceremony again the following year, until it was decided to stop at the end of 2002 to comply.

In 2001 Gov participated in Danny Sanderson's album "תולדות המים – שירים לאחרים" in which Gov performed Sanderson's song "רק את". In 2002 Gov returned to Channel with the show "Laila Gov 2", which was similar to his previous talk show, but failed to repeat its success and was eventually canceled after the first season. In 2003, 12 years after his last solo studio album was released, Gov recorded the album "Rikud Yare'ach" ("Moon Dance"). In 2004 Gov recorded the album "At the end of the mountain" (בקצה ההר) which was mainly written and composed by Amir Benayon. The album was released in early 2005. In 2006 Gov hosted the morning program on Channel 2. In 2007 Gov participated in the Israeli reality show "Once in a lifetime" (פעם בחיים), in which he went to a spiritual commune in the jungles of Costa Rica for two weeks together with the Israeli journalist Gil Riva. In 2008 Gov participated in satire show "גם להם מגיע " together with Lior Ashkenazi and Anat Magen. In 2009 the Israeli label Hed Artzi released the triple disc compilation album "שלל שיריו" which contained Gov's biggest hits through the years.

2010s
In June 2011, Israel TV channel Channel 10 started broadcasting the series "Aharoni & Gidi's Wonderful Journey" with Gidi Gov and chef Yisrael Aharoni. A month later Channel 2 started broadcasting the series "The most beautiful years", in which Gov plays a school principal who dies. That same year, he started doing commercials for Bezeq WiFi.
In 2012 Gidi appears as a judge on the 10th season of the Israeli version of American Idol – Kohav nolad. In August 2015 he released the album Im Hayinu (If We Were).

Solo discography
 1978 – Gidi Gov – Taklit Rishon ("First Album")
 1983 – 40:06
 1985 – Tnu Ligdol Besheket ("Let Me Grow Up in Peace")
 1987 – Derech Eretz ("Ethical behaviour")
 1991 – Ein Od Yom ("No Other Day")
 2003 – Rikud Yare'ach ("Moon Dance")
 2005 – Biktze Ha'har ("At the Mountain's Edge")
 2015 – Im Hayinu ("If We Were")

References

External links
 All about Gidi Gov
 
 

1950 births
Living people
People from Rehovot
20th-century Israeli male singers
21st-century Israeli male singers
Israeli rock singers
Israeli male film actors
Israeli male television actors
Israeli television presenters
Kaveret
Eurovision Song Contest entrants for Israel
Eurovision Song Contest entrants of 1974
Israeli military musicians